The Imperial Japanese Navy fielded naval paratroopers during World War II. The troops were officially part of the Special Naval Landing Forces (SNLF or Rikusentai). They came from the 1st, 2nd and 3rd Yokosuka SNLFs. The 2nd Yokosuka took no part in any airborne operations and became an island defensive base unit. They were under the operational control of the Imperial Japanese Navy Air Service (IJNAS or Dai-Nippon Teikoku Kaigun Koku Hombu). Rikusentai paratroopers should not be confused with the Imperial Japanese Army paratroopers, known as Teishin.

Rikusentai units were grouped in battalion-level formations, named after the three naval districts, including Yokosuka. Paratroop units were only organized on the very eve of the war, beginning in September 1941. The lightly armed parachute units were intended to assault coastal areas, supporting amphibious landings, or enemy airfields and other strategic objectives. They were not meant to become entangled in heavy, pitched land battles. However, their operational use would prove to be contrary to this doctrine.

Formation and tactics
The 1st Yokosuka SNLF (Special Naval Landing Force) was formed 20 September 1941, at Yokosuka Naval District, round a battalion of 520 paratroopers. The 2nd Yokosuka also formed at the Yokosuka port area, 15 October 1941, with 746 men and trained as such, took no part in any airborne operations and became an island defensive base unit. The 3rd Yokosuka was formed on 20 November 1941, again at the Naval facility and consisted of 850 men. This unit was involved in the invasion of Dutch West Timor as airborne inserted infantry, setting off from the captured air base at Kendari.

The paratroopers were led by navy officers who had trained at the Imperial Japanese Army infantry school. Although Rikusentai basic training was different from that of the Japanese Army, the paratroopers were trained at the army base on Kanto Plain. Light arms were furnished from army stocks; heavier material was manufactured by the navy. The first training drop occurred on November 16, 1941.

The Japanese Navy planned to use the paratroop force as a diversion, by co-ordinating the timing of a seaborne assault and parachute drop to create maximum surprise at the point of contact. Rikusentai paratroopers would land inland from beaches where major amphibious assaults were to occur. In particular, it was intended that paratroopers would disable airfields, preventing enemy warplanes from interfering with amphibious landings. The lightly armed paratroopers would have to attack the air base defenses. If they were successful, it would also allow the Japanese to use the airfield for their own warplanes and was comparable to the use of German Fallschirmjager at the Battle of Crete, in May 1941.

Operational history
The 2nd Yokosuka SNLF saw action not as paratroopers, but as an amphibious assault force in the Borneo campaign, from December 1941.

Two companies, numbering 849 paratroopers, from the 1st Yokosuka SNLF, carried out Japan's first ever combat air drop, during the Battle of Menado, in the Netherlands East Indies, on January 11, 1942. Four hours before the airborne landings, the 1st Sasebo SNLF had come ashore by sea nearby.

On February 19, 630 paratroopers from the 3rd Yokosuka SNLF were dropped near Kupang, West Timor, and suffered heavy casualties in the Battle of Timor.

In mid-1942 the 1st Yokosuka SNLF returned to its namesake naval base and what was left of the 3rd Yokosuka took part in unopposed landings on islands in the eastern part of the East Indies archipelago. The 3rd Yokosuka returned to Japan by the end of October 1942.

Equipment
Many weapons were the same as army Teishin units, but some heavy weapons were provided from navy stocks. IJNAS land-based planes — transports, heavy bombers and flying boats — were used to deliver the paratroopers.

Rikusentai paratrooper uniforms

The uniform of Yokosuka 1st, 2nd, (for paratrooper training and fighting on land) and 3rd Rikusentais in Menado and West Timor battles in 1942 was the standard SNLF dark green with dark black or dark brown belts and harness. This uniform was based on the German model. It was later replaced by two types of green uniforms made from rip stop parachute silk with built in bandoliers and cargo pockets, being better designed than other paratrooper models of the time. This two-piece uniform was made of 50% cotton/50% silk. The hip length jacket had two differing pocket layouts, one had an angled pistol holster on the right chest, a two-grenade pocket on the left chest, and three smaller pockets for ammunition or grenades on each skirt side. The second version jacket had two pleated chest pockets and a smaller pleated skirt pockets. The trousers featured several variations of hip and cargo pockets. Headgear was similar to the IJA fieldcap but with a chinstrap and integral side and neck piece. Personnel also wore laced high brown leather boots as well as brown leather gloves.

Personal equipment 
The padded leather helmet was later replaced by a steel one based on the IJN's Type 3 but with a cut down rim. They wore standard infantry equipment with additional ammunition bandoliers, along with dark brown boots and gloves. Later a simplified uniform type was used with the same SNLF standard color, and with the same type of belts and harness.

Sometimes a naval life preserver vest was worn over the uniform to carry cartridges and hand grenades. Standard Nambu pistol or revolver and a knife were in belt or boot.

Parachute and harness
The first specifically designed Japanese military parachute was the Type 01 of 1941, similar to the German RZ version, which had more in common with the Italian D-30 series chute in having a canopy diameter of 28 feet (8.5 metres) and in a pronounced hemispherical shape with skirting and a vent hole for stable flight.
 
The harness was modified in the later Type 03, leaving out the lift webs, and with the rigging lines brought to a single point connected to a large steel ‘D’ ring behind the paratroopers neck for a more upright controlled landing.

The particular Japanese method of opening the folded and packed chute through the use of static line was quite dangerous and liable to failure. Each paratrooper also carried a 24 feet (7.3 metres) reserve chest-pack, and the basic Japanese naval parachutist training program required jumps between 300–500 feet (90–150 m), which would not give much time to deploy the emergency chute, or let alone delay deploying the main canopy.

Aircraft
Nakajima L2D2 Rei Yosoh Type 00 "Tabby"
Mitsubishi L4M1 (naval version of Mitsubishi Ki-57 "Topsy")
Mitsubishi G3M2/3 "Nell" Land-based bomber
Mitsubishi L3Y1/2-L (transport version of Mitsubishi G3M)
Mitsubishi G4M2 "Betty" Land-based bomber
Mitsubishi G6M1/2-L (transport version of G4M1/2 Bomber)
Mitsubishi K3M3-L "Pine"
Nakajima G5N2-L Shinzan "Liz"
Nakajima L1N1 (naval version of Nakajima Ki-34 "Thora")
Nakajima C2N1 (naval version of Nakajima Ki-6)
Kawanishi H6K2-L flying-boat
Kawanishi H8K2-L "Emily" flying-boat
Yokosuka H5Y1 "Cherry"
Aichi H9A1

The navy also ordered the development of an experimental heavy glider, the Yokosuka MXY5, for airborne operations, but these were never fully developed.

Light weapons
Type 94 8 mm pistol
Type 26 9 mm revolver
Type 14 8 mm Nambu pistol
TERA rifle
Type 99 rifle
Bayonets
SIG M1920
MP 34
Type 100 submachine gun
Type 96 light machine gun
Type 99 light machine gun
Type 97 20 mm anti-tank rifle
Type 91 hand grenade
Type 89 grenade launcher
Type 91 grenade launcher
Taisho Type 11 70mm infantry mortar
Type 99 81 mm mortar
Type 11 37 mm infantry gun

There were plans to equip the paratroop units with light tanks like the Type 95 Ha-Go, to operate as naval Airborne Armor Troop units but this was not implemented.

Operational commanders
Commander Toyoaki Horiuchi: led the 1st Yokosuka SNLF (519 men in two waves) in the Menado operation.
Lieutenant Commander Koichi Fukumi: led the 3rd Yokosuka SNLF (630 troops in two waves) in the West Timor campaign.

See also
1st Airborne Brigade (Japan)
Giretsu (special forces operations)
Paramarines (special USMC airborne forces)

Notes

References

External links
WW II Japanese Paratrooper Song
Military history of Japan during World War II
Imperial Japanese Navy
Disbanded marine forces
Airborne units and formations